Robert Adamson (1753 - 17 September 1817) was the member of Parliament for Cricklade in England from 13 April 1784 to 4 April 1785.

References 

Members of the Parliament of Great Britain for Cricklade
1753 births
1817 deaths
People educated at Eton College